Dirac is an open and royalty-free video compression format, specification and system developed by BBC Research & Development. Schrödinger and dirac-research (formerly just called "Dirac") are open and royalty-free software implementations (video codecs) of Dirac. Dirac format aims to provide high-quality video compression for Ultra HDTV and beyond, and as such competes with existing formats such as H.264 and VC-1.

The specification was finalised in January 2008, and further developments are only bug fixes and constraints. In September of that year, version 1.0.0 of an I-frame only subset known as Dirac Pro was released and has since been standardised by the SMPTE as VC-2. Version 2.2.3 of the full Dirac specification, including motion compensation and inter-frame coding, was issued a few days later. Dirac Pro was used internally by the BBC to transmit HDTV pictures at the Beijing Olympics in 2008.

The format implementations are named in honour of the theoretical physicists Paul Dirac and Erwin Schrödinger, who shared the 1933 Nobel Prize in physics.

Technology
Dirac supports resolutions of HDTV (1920×1080) and greater, and is claimed to provide significant savings in data rate and improvements in quality over video compression formats such as MPEG-2 Part 2, MPEG-4 Part 2 and its competitors, e.g. Theora, and WMV. Dirac's implementers make the preliminary claim of "a two-fold reduction in bit rate over MPEG-2 for high definition video", which makes it comparable to standards such as H.264/MPEG-4 AVC and VC-1.

Dirac supports both constant bit rate and variable bit rate operation. When the low delay syntax is used, the bit rate will be constant for each area (Dirac slice) in a picture to ensure constant latency. Dirac supports lossy and lossless compression modes.

Dirac employs wavelet compression, like the JPEG 2000 and PGF image formats and the Cineform professional video codec, instead of the discrete cosine transforms used in MPEG compression formats. Two of the specific wavelets Dirac can use are nearly identical to JPEG 2000's (known as the 5/3 and 9/7 wavelets), as well as two more derived from them.

Dirac can be used in AVI, Ogg and Matroska container formats and is also registered for use in the MPEG-4 file format and MPEG-2 transport streams.

VC-2
Dirac Pro was proposed to the SMPTE for standardisation. The Dirac Pro specification defines an I-frame only subset of the main Dirac Specification, aimed for professional and studio use in high bitrate applications. In 2010, the SMPTE standardised Dirac Pro as VC-2.

 SMPTE 2042-1:2009 VC-2 Video Compression
 SMPTE 2042-2:2009 VC-2 Level Definitions
 RP (Recommended Practices) 2047-1-2009 – VC-2 Mezzanine Level Compression of 1080P High Definition Video Sources
 SMPTE 2047-2:2010  Carriage of VC-2 Compressed Video over HD-SDI
 RP 2042-3:2010 – VC-2 Conformance Specification

The basic spec was updated in 2012, adding a new profile for lossless and near-lossless archiving.

Software implementations

Two software implementations of the specification currently exist. The first is the BBC's reference implementation, formerly just called Dirac but renamed dirac-research to avoid confusion. It is written in C++ and released under the Mozilla Public License, GNU GPL 2 and GNU LGPL free software licenses. Version 1.0.0 of this implementation was released on 17 September 2008.

A second implementation called Schrödinger was funded by the BBC and aims to provide high-performance, portable version of the codec whilst remaining 100% bitstream compatible. Schrödinger is written in ANSI C and released under the same licenses as dirac-research, as well as the highly-permissive MIT License. The Schrödinger project also provides GStreamer plugins to enable the library to be used with that framework. On 22 February 2008, Schrödinger 1.0.0 was released. This release was able to decode HD720/25p in real-time on a Core Duo laptop.

As of the release of Schrödinger-1.0.9, "Schrödinger outperforms dirac-research in most encoding situations, both in terms of encoding speed and visual quality". With that release, most of the encoding tools in dirac-research have been ported over to Schrödinger, giving Schrödinger the same as or better compression efficiency than dirac-research.

An encoder quality testing system has been put in place at BBC to check how well new encoding tools work and to make sure bugs that affect quality are quickly fixed.

Patents
The BBC does not own any patents on Dirac. They previously had some patent applications with plans to irrevocably grant a royalty-free licence for their Dirac-related patents to everyone, but they let the applications lapse. In addition, the developers have said they will try to ensure that Dirac does not infringe on any third party patents, enabling the public to use Dirac for any purpose.

Desktop playback and encoding
As of November 2008, Dirac video playback is supported by VLC media player (version 0.9.2 or newer), and by applications using the GStreamer framework (such as Songbird, Rhythmbox and Totem). Support has also been added to FFmpeg.

Applications which can encode to Dirac include MediaCoder, LiVES and OggConvert, as well as FFmpeg.

Performance
The algorithms in the Dirac specification have been designed with the intention to provide a competitive performance as compared to state-of-the-art international standards. Whether they succeeded is an open question; while at least one comparison exists which used implementations from the second quarter of 2008—it shows x264 scoring higher than Dirac—it is now somewhat out of date. A study on the performances of the Dirac codec, dated from August 2009, finds that the quality obtained on SDTV is inferior to the H.264 output and did not include HD content.

References

External links
 
 BBC Research & Development page on VC-2

BBC Research & Development
Free video codecs
Lossless compression algorithms
SMPTE standards
Wavelets
Open formats